The 1965–66 Egyptian Premier League, was the 16th season of the Egyptian Premier League, the top Egyptian professional league for association football clubs, since its establishment in 1948. The season started on 1 October 1965 and concluded on 10 May 1966.
Olympic Club managed to win the league for the first time in the club's history.

League table

 (C)= Champion, (R)= Relegated, Pld = Matches played; W = Matches won; D = Matches drawn; L = Matches lost; F = Goals for; A = Goals against; ± = Goal difference; Pts = Points.

El Qanah were relegated, and 2nd round results were cancelled after withdrawal in their last match.

Top goalscorers

Teams

References

External links 
 All Egyptian Competitions Info

5
1965–66 in African association football leagues
1965–66 in Egyptian football